Wild Strawberries or Wild Strawberry may refer to:

Plants
 Wild strawberries, a common name for uncultivated species in the strawberry genus Fragaria, especially:
 Fragaria vesca, the common wild strawberry in Europe, also occurring in North America
 Fragaria virginiana, the common wild strawberry in North America

Politics
 Wild Strawberries Movement, a student protest movement in Taiwan

Film
 Wild Strawberries (film), a 1957 film by Ingmar Bergman
 Mountain Strawberries, a 1982 South Korean film also known as Wild Strawberries

Music
 Wild Strawberries (band), a Canadian pop music group
 "Wild Strawberries" (song), a 2007 song by Australian group Pnau from their eponymous album
 Wild Strawberries, a 1986 English-language album by the Yugoslav and Bosnian band Divlje jagode

See also
 Strawberry (disambiguation)
 Grass and Wild Strawberries